The Paraguayan bolo mouse or Paraguayan akodont (Necromys lenguarum) is a species of rodent in the family Cricetidae. According to the IUCN, it is present in Bolivia, Paraguay, and Peru, and possibly also in Argentina and Brazil.

Taxonomy
The taxonomic status of this species is unclear. It was at one time thought to be a subspecies of the dark bolo mouse N. obscurus, and some authorities consider it to be a synonym of N. lasiurus. Mitochondrial DNA analysis supports it being a species in its own right, but the precise range occupied by each species has not been elucidated.

Description
The upper surface of head and body is dark grey, and the rump ochre-grey. The flanks are paler and the underparts are white, sometimes with a yellowish tinge. The tail is black above and white below, and the hands and feet have uniformly grey upper surfaces.

Distribution
According to J. L. Patton, the Paraguayan bolo mouse is native to southeastern Peru, western Paraguay, and southwestern Brazil. Reported sightings from eastern Bolivia and Jujuy and Chaco provinces in northern Argentina need re-evaluation because they may be of the much more widespread N. lasiurus.

Status
The Paraguayan bolo mouse is a common species with a wide range. It is assumed to have a large total population and is capable of tolerating disturbance to its habitat such as clearance of vegetation for cattle ranching. The International Union for Conservation of Nature has assessed its conservation status as being of "least concern".

References

Mammals of Argentina
Necromys
Mammals described in 1898
Taxa named by Oldfield Thomas